{{Infobox election
| election_name = 2004 United States Senate election in Utah
| country = Utah
| type = presidential
| ongoing = no
| previous_election = 1998 United States Senate election in Utah
| previous_year = 1998
| next_election = 2010 United States Senate election in Utah
| next_year = 2010
| flag_year = 1922
| election_date = November 2, 2004
| image1 = 
| nominee1 = Bob Bennett
| party1 = Republican Party (United States)
| popular_vote1 = 626,640
| percentage1 = 68.7%
| image2 = 
| nominee2 = Paul Van Dam
| party2 = Democratic Party (United States)
| popular_vote2 = 258,955
| percentage2 = 28.4%
| map_image = 2004 United States Senate election in Utah results map by county.svg
| map_size = 220px
| map_caption = County resultsBennett:    
|title = U.S. Senator
| before_election = Bob Bennett
| before_party = Republican Party (United States)
| after_election = Bob Bennett
| after_party = Republican Party (United States)
}}

The 2004 United States Senate election in Utah''' was held on November 2, 2004. Incumbent Republican U.S. Senator Bob Bennett won re-election to a third term.

Major candidates

Democratic 
 Paul Van Dam, former Attorney General of Utah and former Salt Lake County District Attorney

Declined 
 Ken Jennings, game show contestant

Republican 
 Bob Bennett, incumbent U.S. Senator

General election

Predictions

Polling

Results

See also 
 2004 United States Senate elections

References 

2004 Utah elections
Utah
2004